Jüterbog Airfield (also known as Altes Lager airfield) was a military air base located west of the town of Jüterbog, in Brandenburg, Germany. Nowadays paragliders and hang gliders start from Altes Lager.

History
Developed as part of the Nazi Germany's programme to develop the German population's flying skills in preparation for war, it was opened as a glider training establishment. Taken over by the Luftwaffe in 1933, it was fully developed as a military airfield.

After being overrun by the Red Army in May 1945, towards the end of World War II, it came under the control of the occupying forces of the Soviet Union. From this point forward, several units of the Soviet Air Force were stationed at the site. The attached air regiment of the 833 IAP were initially equipped with the MiG-9, later replaced by the MiG-29 Fulcrum-A/B fighter and MiG-23UM Flogger-C operational trainer. The regiment was part of the 16th Guards Fighter Aviation Division within the 16th Air Army with headquarters in Damgarten.

With the reunification of Germany from 1989/1990, the Soviet Army agreed to return all bases by the end of 1994. The airfield was handed back to the district authorities in 1992.

Nellis AFR copy
Experts suggest that the airfield has been copied by the United States Air Force, as part of its Tolicha Peak Electronic Combat Range (TPECR), in the western part of the Nevada Test and Training Range.

However, it has a northeastern taxiway loop which is characteristical for Jüterbog, and three ramps in front of hangars on the western side of the loop. The other taxiways have a similar layout, although the runway is about  shorter.

References

World War II airfields in Germany
Luftwaffe bases
Military facilities of the Soviet Union in Germany
Airports in Brandenburg
Defunct airports in Germany